Jehan Vaillant was a French music composer and theorist.

Jean Vaillant may also refer to:

 Jan Vaillant (1627–1668), Dutch painter
 Jean Vaillant (athlete), French athlete
 Jean Alexandre Vaillant (1804–1886), French and Romanian teacher and political activist
 Jean Baptiste Vaillant (1751–1837), general of the French Revolutionary Wars and the Napoleonic Wars
 Jean Vaillant, military person from Battle of Mello, 1358